Memorials to George Floyd commemorate the African American man who was murdered by a Minneapolis police officer on May 25, 2020.

George Floyd memorial or George Floyd Memorial may refer to:

Artwork 
 Bust of George Floyd, a sculpture in Brooklyn, New York
 George Floyd and Anti-Racist Street Art database, a free, digital library
 George Floyd mural (Portland, Oregon), a former public art exhibit
 Statue of George Floyd, a bronze sculpture in Newark, New Jersey

Events 
 George Floyd Square occupied protest, a former semi-autonomous zone in Minneapolis, Minnesota
 Lists of George Floyd protests

Proposed U.S. laws 

 BREATHE Act
 George Floyd Justice in Policing Act
 George Floyd Law Enforcement Trust and Integrity Act, a bill subtitle

Organizations 
 George Floyd Global Memorial, a non-profit organization in Minneapolis, Minnesota
 George Floyd Memorial Foundation, a non-profit organization founded by Bridgett Floyd in Mooresville, North Carolina
 Official George Floyd Memorial Fund, a GoFundMe campaign

Street intersection 

 George Floyd Square, the intersection in Minneapolis, Minnesota

See also 

 George Floyd (disambiguation)
 List of Black Lives Matter street murals
 List of monuments and memorials removed during the George Floyd protests
 List of name changes due to the George Floyd protests
 Memorials to George Floyd